Heaven and Hell (transliterated Janna wa narr) is an Egyptian film released on December 1, 1952. The film is directed by Hussein Fawzi, features a screenplay by Abo El Seoud El Ebiary, and stars Naima Akef, Abdel Aziz Mahmoud, and Shoukry Sarhan. The plot centers on the friendship between a poor orphan girl named Nancy and her neighbor Abdel Haq. He helps her support her six brothers as a dancer, but she does not reciprocate his affection.

Cast

Main cast
 Naima Akef (Nancy, an orphan girl)
 Abdel Aziz Mahmoud (Abdel Haq, Nancy's neighbor)

Supporting cast
 Hussein Riad
 Shoukry Sarhan
 Aziza Helmy
 Abdel Salam Al Nabulsy
 Abdel Rahim El Zarkany
 Ahmed Allam
 Widad Hamdi
 Abdel Ghani Nagdi
 Abdelmonem Ismail
 Ahmed Amer
 Abdel Moneim Bassiouni
 Abdul Hamid al-Qalawi
 Sayed al-Maghribi

Child cast
 Salwa el-Sayed
 Abdel Moneim Suleiman
 Wajih al-Atrash
 Magdy al-Sayed
 Inshirah Akef
 Felfela

Synopsis
Nancy (Naima Akef), an orphan girl, works to support her six siblings. She has nobody to turn to in this except for her neighbor, the singer Abdel Haq (Abdel Aziz Mahmoud), who invites her into his troupe as a dancer and loves her unrequitedly. She gets to know Abdel Haq's uncle Maarouf (Hussein Riad), who lives in a palace like a prisoner of his daughter-in-law Qassem, who seeks to inherit his fortune after his death. Maarouf showers Nancy with gifts via his grandson who loves her, leading to misunderstandings and jealousy of him by Abdel Haq. The neighborhood convinces him to leave her be, so he travels to Alexandria to separate. Nancy ends up with him in the end, putting love over money.

Songs

External links
 El Cinema page
 IMDb page
 Dhliz page
  Karohat page
 Musical number on YouTube
 Musical number on YouTube

References

Egyptian black comedy films
1952 films